Castagnac is a commune in the Haute-Garonne department in southwestern France.

Geography
The Lèze forms most of the commune's north-eastern border. There are numerous hiking routes.

The commune is bordered by five other communes, three of them is in Haute-Garonne, and two of them is in Ariège: Latrape to the west, Canens to the south, Massabrac to the southeast, and finally by the department of Ariège to the north and east by the communes of Lézat-sur-Lèze to the north and Saint-Ybars to the east.

Population

Sights and monuments
 Château de Castagnac, medieval castle listed by the French Ministry of Culture as a monument historique since 18 March 2003.
 Gardens of the château.
 Windmill
 Église Saint-Sébastien, restored Gothic church

See also
Communes of the Haute-Garonne department

References

Communes of Haute-Garonne